WiFi Explorer is a wireless network scanner tool for macOS that can help users identify channel conflicts, overlapping and network configuration issues that may be affecting the connectivity and performance of Wi-Fi networks.

History
WiFi Explorer began as a desktop alternative to WiFi Analyzer, an iPhone app for wireless network scanning that was pulled out from Apple's App Store in March, 2010, due to the use of private frameworks. Since its first release, WiFi Explorer incorporated features that were not included in the last available version of WiFi Analyzer, such as support for 5 GHz networks and 40 MHz channel widths. Starting in version 1.5, WiFi Explorer included support for 802.11ac networks, as well as 80 and 160 MHz channel widths. On June 22, 2017, a professional version of WiFi Explorer, WiFi Explorer Pro, was released. WiFi Explorer Pro offers additional features especially designed for WLAN and IT professionals. 
The standard version of WiFi Explorer is also available on Setapp.

Features

Standard
 Displays various network parameters:
 Network name (SSID) and MAC address (BSSID)
 Manufacturer
 AP name for certain Cisco and Aruba devices
 Beacon interval
 Mode (802.11a/b/g/n/ac)
 Band (2.4 GHz ISM and 5 GHz UNII-1, 2, 2 Extended, and 3)
 Channel width (20, 40, 80, and 160 MHz)
 Secondary channel offset
 Security mode (WEP, WPA, WPA2)
 Support for Wi-Fi Protected Setup (WPS)
 Supported basic, min and max data rates
 Advertised 802.11 Information Elements
 Graphical visualization of channel allocation, signal strength or Signal-to-noise ratio (SNR)
 Different sorting and filtering options
 Displays signal strength and noise values as percentage or dBm
 Ability to save and load results for later analysis
 Metrics and network details can be exported to a CSV file format
 Selectable and sortable columns
 Adjustable graph timescales
 Editable column for annotations, comments, etc.
 Customizable network colors
 Full screen mode
 Comprehensive application's help

Professional
 Passive and directed scan modes
 Spectrum analysis integration
 Apple's iOS AirPort Utility integration
 Enhanced filtering
 Support for remote sensors
 Support for networks with hidden SSIDs
 Support for external USB Wi-Fi adapters via the External Adapter Support Environment (EASE)
 Additional organization options for scan results
 Dark and light themes

Limitations
Due to limitations of Apple's CoreWLAN framework, the standard version of WiFi Explorer is unable to detect hidden networks (except when connected to it) and does not support external USB Wi-Fi adapters. The Pro edition supports passive scanning, which can detect hidden networks, and can make use of external adapters via the External Adapter Support Environment (EASE).

System requirements
 macOS 10.10 or higher (64-bit)

See also
 iStumbler - An open-source utility for finding wireless networks and devices in macOS.
 KisMAC - A wireless network discovery tool for macOS.
 Netspot - A macOS tool for wireless networks assessment, scanning and surveys.

References

External links
 

Wireless networking
MacOS network-related software

el:WiFi Explorer